Lyon-Jean Macé station (French: Gare de Lyon-Jean Macé) is a railway station in the 7th arrondissement of Lyon. It is situated on the Paris–Marseille railway and the Lyon–Geneva railway. The station is a part of the Lyon urban area rapid transit network. It was aimed to decongest the major stations Part-Dieu and Perrache while allowing access to the public transport of Lyon (TCL). The station began operation on 13 December 2009.

History
Originally only one railway stop was planned, that is to say that any tickets, except ATMs, could be bought there. But the project expanded to include the redevelopment of the area surrounding the railway station, and plans envisage that the Jean-Macé station will become the intramural sixth station of Lyon, joining Lyon-Perrache, Lyon Vaise, Lyon-Saint-Paul, Lyon-Gorge de Loup and Lyon Part-Dieu. The project, under the supervision of works of RFF and SNCF and costing about 30 million euros, has benefited from the shared commitment of all partners and financial markets: Le Grand Lyon (37%), Région Rhône-Alpes (36.5%), Réseau Ferré de France (19.8%), Sytral (5.3%), SNCF (1.3%).

The station allows passengers to regional trains from Bourgoin-Jallieu, La Tour-du-Pin, Saint-André-le-Gaz, Vienne, Valence, Mâcon and Villefranche-sur-Saône, according to their final destination, to use the new station as additional entry point in the center of Lyon.

The station was officially opened on 8 December 2009, and five days later it opened to the public. The first year, 3800 passengers per day were expected, including 1,800 new customers, and the goal is to reach 6600 passengers for 2015.

Location and description
The station is located on the railway bridge which is parallel to the avenue Berthelot and perpendicular to the avenue Jean-Jaurès. It is served by line B of the metro, the tram T2, many city buses (lines C4, C7, C12, C14, 35, S3, Zi6), a taxi station and two Vélo'v stations.

It is accessed via two entrances on both sides of the avenue, under the bridge. In the halls, a screen displays real-time the next departures of the different transport in Lyon from the pole Jean Macé.

This station is the first one in Lyon to be equipped with a collective record that can accommodate 110 bicycles.

See also 
 Transport in Rhône-Alpes
 TER Auvergne-Rhône-Alpes

References

External links
 Official site
 Timetables, TER Auvergne-Rhône-Alpes

7th arrondissement of Lyon
Jean Mace
Railway stations in France opened in 2009
Lyon-Jean Macé